Starodyurtyukeyevo (İśke Dürtekäy) is a rural locality (a village) in Seytyakovsky Selsoviet, Baltachevsky District, Bashkortostan, Russia. The population was 83 as of 2010. There are 2 streets.

Geography 
Starodyurtyukeyevo is located 25 km southwest of Starobaltachevo (the district's administrative centre) by road. Novodyurtyukeyevo and Starokizganovo are the nearest rural localities.

References 

Rural localities in Baltachevsky District